Naser Obaid (Arabic:ناصر عبيد) (born 7 November 1988) is an Emirati footballer. He currently plays as a winger for Masafi.

Career
Naser Obaid started his career at Hatta and is a product of the Hatta's youth system. and after hem played for Masfout, and Al Dhaid.

External links

References

1988 births
Living people
Emirati footballers
Hatta Club players
Masfout Club players
Al Dhaid SC players
Masafi Club players
UAE Pro League players
UAE First Division League players
Association football wingers
Place of birth missing (living people)